Le Relecq-Kerhuon is a commune in the Finistère department of Brittany in north-western France.

Population
Inhabitants of Le Relecq-Kerhuon are called in French Relecquois or Kerhorres.

Breton language
The municipality launched a linguistic plan concerning the Breton language through Ya d'ar brezhoneg on September 2, 2005.

International relations
  Le Relecq-Kerhuon is twinned with Bodmin in Cornwall, UK.

See also
Communes of the Finistère department

References

External links

Official website 

Mayors of Finistère Association 

Communes of Finistère